Clyde W. Robbins (June 7, 1926–July 20, 2001) was an American farmer and politician.

Robbins was born in Akron, Ohio. He moved with his family  to Wayne County, Illinois and settled in Geff, Illinois. Robbins went to the Wayne County  public schools. Robbins was a farmer and raised cattle in rural Fairfield, Illinois. He was involved with the Republican Party. Robbins served on the Geff School Board. He served in the Illinois House of Representatives from 1979 to 1982.

Notes

1926 births
2001 deaths
Politicians from Akron, Ohio
People from Wayne County, Illinois
Farmers from Illinois
School board members in Illinois
Republican Party members of the Illinois House of Representatives
20th-century American politicians